Peyton is an English surname and both a male and female given name. The Gaelic variation in Ireland is Ó Peatáin.

Surname 
Balie Peyton (1803–1878), American lawyer and politician
Ben Peyton (born 1977), British actor
Benny Peyton (1965), American jazz drummer
Bob Peyton (born 1954), English former footballer
Brad Peyton (born 1980), Canadian-born film director
Caroline Peyton (born 1951), American singer and songwriter
Craig Peyton (born 1953), American producer
Dave Peyton (1955), American songwriter, pianist, and arranger
Edward Peyton (died 1749), officer of the Royal Navy
Elizabeth Peyton (born 1965), American painter
Ephraim G. Peyton (1802–after 1876), justice of the Mississippi Supreme Court
Gerry Peyton (born 1956), English football player
Sir Henry Peyton, 1st Baronet (1736–1789), MP for Cambridgeshire 1782–89
Sir Henry Peyton, 2nd Baronet (1779–1854), MP for Cambridgeshire in 1802
Sir Henry Peyton, 3rd Baronet (1804–1866), MP for Woodstock 1837–38
Herb Peyton (born 1932), American entrepreneur and founder of Gate Petroleum in Jacksonville, Florida
Jane Peyton (1870–1946), American actress
John Peyton (disambiguation), the name of several people
Joseph Hopkins Peyton (1808–1845), American politician
K. M. Peyton (born 1929), British author
Kate Peyton (1965–2005), Senior Producer for the BBC Johannesburg Bureau 2002–05
Kim Peyton (1957–1986), competitive freestyle swimmer, Gold medalist for the United States at the 1976 Montreal Summer Olympics
Malcolm Peyton (born 1932), American composer, concert director, conductor, and teacher
Mike Peyton (born 1921), British cartoonist
Noel Peyton (born 1935), Irish former professional footballer
Oliver Peyton (born 1963), Irish restaurateur and judge on the BBC television series Great British Menu
Patrick Peyton (1909–1992), Irish-born American priest
Robert Ludwell Yates Peyton (1822–1863), American politician and soldier
Rog Peyton (born 1942), science fiction bookseller and editor
Samuel Peyton (1804–1870), U.S. Representative from Kentucky
Shelly Peyton, American chemist
Tony Peyton (1922–2007), member of the Harlem Globetrotters basketball team
Warren Peyton (born 1979), English footballer
Whitney Peyton, American rapper from Philadelphia, Pennsylvania
William Peyton (1866–1931), British general

Given name 
Peyton C. March (1864–1955), American soldier and Army Chief of Staff
Peyton Evans (1892–1972), former head coach of the University of Virginia college football program from 1916 to 1916
Peyton Gordon (1870–1946), United States federal judge
Peyton H. Colquitt (1831–1863), Confederate Officer
Peyton Hendershot (born 1999), American football player
Peyton Hillis (born 1986), American football player
Peyton Elizabeth Lee (born 2004), American actress
Peyton List (born 1986), American actress
Peyton List (born 1998), American actress
Peyton M. Magruder (1911–1982), aircraft designer
Peyton Manning (born 1976), American football player
Peyton R. Helm, eleventh president of Muhlenberg College
Peyton Randolph (governor) (1779–1828), American politician
Peyton Randolph (1721–1775), American politician
Peyton Reed (born 1964), American director
Peyton Sellers (born 1983), American race car driver, competing in the NASCAR Nationwide Series
Peyton Short (1761–1825), land speculator and politician in Kentucky
Peyton Siva (born 1990), American basketball player
Peyton Thompson (born 1990), American football player
Peyton Watson (born 2002), American basketball player
Peyton Young (born 1945), American game theorist

Fictional characters
 Peyton (Chaotic), in the television series Chaotic
 Peyton Charles, in the television series iZombie
 Peyton Driscoll, in the television series CSI: NY
 Peyton Farquhar, character in the short story An Occurrence at Owl Creek Bridge by Ambrose Bierce
 Peyton Kelly, in the 2007 film The Game Plan
 Peyton Leverett, in the 2011 film Sharpay's Fabulous Adventure
 Peyton Loftis, in the 1951 novel Lie Down in Darkness by William Styron
 Peyton Mott, in the 1992 film The Hand That Rocks the Cradle
 Peyton Sawyer, character in the television series One Tree Hill
 Peyton Westlake, in the 1990 film Darkman
 Kelly Peyton, character in the television series Alias
 Peyton Bragg, character in the 1959 novel Alas, Babylon

See also
Payton (given name)
Payton (surname)